3R4 is an album by Bruce Gilbert and Graham Lewis, credited as B.C. Gilbert and G. Lewis, respectively. It was released in 1980 by record label 4AD.

Content 

Trouser Press wrote: "3R4 moves into the ambient drone music pioneered by Brian Eno, and its four tracks achieve an almost symphonic effect".

Track listing

Personnel
B.C. Gilbert - guitar, bass, percussion
G. Lewis - guitar, synthesizer, tapes, percussion
Davyd Boyd - bass, voices
Russell Mills - percussion 
Technical
Eric Radcliffe - engineer
John Fryer - assistant engineer, tapes

See also 

 Dome

References

External links 

 

1980 albums
Wire (band)